Paratrechalea is a genus of spiders in the family Trechaleidae. It was first described in 2005 by Carico. , it contains 7 species from Brazil, Argentina, Uruguay.

Species
Paratrechalea comprises the following species:
Paratrechalea azul Carico, 2005
Paratrechalea galianoae Carico, 2005
Paratrechalea julyae Silva & Lise, 2006
Paratrechalea longigaster Carico, 2005
Paratrechalea ornata (Mello-Leitão, 1943)
Paratrechalea saopaulo Carico, 2005
Paratrechalea wygodzinskyi (Soares & Camargo, 1948)

References

Trechaleidae
Araneomorphae genera
Spiders of South America